William D. "Bill" Law is an American academic and former community college administrator. He resigned as President of St. Petersburg College in St. Petersburg, Florida effective July 1, 2017.

Biography
Law graduated with a Bachelor's degree in English from LeMoyne College. He received his Master's degree and Doctorate in design and management of postsecondary education from Florida State University.

Law began his career as staff director of Committee on Higher Education of the Florida House of Representatives and worked for the Florida Board of Regents. In 1981 he became the vice president of Institutional and Program Planning at St. Petersburg College (then St. Petersburg Junior College), where he worked until 1988.

From 1988 to 1992, he was president of Lincoln Land Community College in Springfield, Illinois. He was the founding president of Montgomery College just outside Houston, serving in that role from 1992 to 2002, and president of Tallahassee Community College from 2002 to 2010.

In 2010 Law became the sixth president of St. Petersburg College, following the unexpected retirement of Carl M. Kuttler, Jr. In November 2016, he announced his resignation effective July 1, 2017.

Along with Ambassador Allan J. Katz, Law co-founded nonprofit The Village Square.

Personal
Law is an avid runner and has completed over two dozen marathons, including five Boston Marathons. He and his wife Pat are the parents of two adult sons.

See also
Florida Community Colleges System

References

External links
 President Law's Official bio
 Law's bio
 A message from President Law
 Tallahassee Democrat article about Dr. Law and tuition at TCC
 Dr. Law talks about expanded enrollment
 

Living people
St. Petersburg College faculty
Florida State University alumni
Le Moyne College alumni
Year of birth missing (living people)